The Taiwan LPGA Tour is a professional golf tour for women organized by the Taiwan Ladies Professional Golfers' Association (TLPGA).

History
The Taiwan Professional Golf Association (TPGA) formed a "Ladies Committee" that organized three small golf tournaments for the golf ladies in 2000. The following year the committee became independent from the TPGA and was renamed the Taiwan Ladies Professional Golf Association (TLPGA). The longest running tournament is the TLPGA & Royal Open which was founded in 2002 and takes place annually at the Royal Golf Club. The Taiwan LPGA Tour was launched in 2003 and the Order of Merit was first implemented in 2006.

Cooperation
In 2011, the TLPGA began a cooperation with the Ladies Asian Golf Tour (LAGT) and several tournaments including the TLPGA & Royal Open, the Hitachi Ladies Classic and the Taifong Ladies Open appeared on the LAGT schedule, and since 2015 the reverse is true for the Hong Kong Ladies Open. In 2016, TLPGA co-sanctioned two tournaments, the Florida's Natural Charity Classic and Chico's Patty Berg Memorial, with the Symetra Tour. That year the TLPGA total purse grew to TWD 199 million. Since 2017, TLPGA co-sanctions the Japan Taiwan Friendship Udon-Ken Ladies Golf Tournament with the LPGA of Japan Step Up Tour, and beginning in 2019 TLPGA and LPGA of Korea co-sanctions the Taiwan Women's Golf Open with a purse of US$800,000.

Starting in 2011, Taiwan also hosts the LPGA Taiwan Championship, an LPGA Tour event with a purse of US$2.2 million.

WWGR
In 2014, TLPGA received official recognition from the Women's World Golf Rankings, and performances on the Taiwan LPGA Tour carry WWGR points like the eight other major women's tours (LPGA, JLPGA, KLPGA, LET, ALPG, China LPGA Tour, Symetra Tour and LET Access Series).

Order of Merit
The Order of Merit was first launched by the TLPGA in 2006. From 2006 to 2011, it was based on points. Beginning in 2012, it is based on prize money, denominated in New Taiwan dollars.

Source:

See also
LPGA Taiwan Championship (LPGA Tour)
Taiwan Ladies Open (Ladies European Tour)

References

External links
 

Professional golf tours
Women's golf
Golf in Taiwan
2003 establishments in Taiwan
Sports leagues established in 2003